In classical Chinese philology, shengxun (聲訓 "voice explanation") or yinxun (音訓 "sound explanation") is the practice of explaining a character by using a homophone or near-homophone. The practice is ancient, and can be seen in pre-Qin texts. Xu Shen, author of the monumental Shuowen Jiezi, employed shengxun. For example, when Xu explained the word "ghost", he wrote:
人所歸爲鬼 (A ghost is where (the state that) human beings return to)
歸 ("to return to"; guī) and 鬼("ghost"; guǐ) are near-homophones. (A similar explanation of the word can be found in the earlier Erya.)

The ancient Chinese dictionary Shiming is noted for using shengxun for most of its definitions.

Shengxun can be highly fanciful, and often results in folk etymology. However, the practice points to the idea of "cognate characters" (同源字) or what Bernhard Karlgren called "word families".

References
Zhongguo da baike quanshu. First Edition. Beijing; Shanghai: Zhongguo da baike quanshu chubanshe. 1980–1993.

Chinese characters
Chinese dictionaries